Ankler Media is an American digital media company.  the Ankler Media Group included three main business areas: email newsletters, podcasts, and live events. In 2021, its flagship newsletter on Substack was listed as one of the top three business publications on the platform.

History

Founding and early years (2017–2021) 
In February 2017, Richard Rushfield founded The Ankler as a paid subscription publication about the entertainment industry, which he then moved to the Substack platform two years later. Before starting the newsletter, Rushfield wrote for BuzzFeed, The Los Angeles Times, and Gawker.

Ankler Media (2022-present) 
In January 2022, Janice Min officially joined the company to form Ankler Media, which expanded the initial newsletter into several newsletters, podcasts, and live events. Min joined as co-owner and CEO, with Richard Rushfield taking the role of editorial director.

According to the New York Times, “A focus of Ankler Media’s coverage will be the clashes between the tech executives now making big decisions in Hollywood and the ones who have been around since moviegoers waited in line to buy tickets.”

In June 2022, the company raised $1.5 million at a $20 million valuation through Y Combinator.

References

External links

 

Companies based in Los Angeles
Entertainment companies established in 2017
Mass media companies established in 2017
Publishing companies established in 2017
Online mass media companies of the United States